The Roman Catholic Diocese of Ragusa is in Sicily. It was erected in 1950. It is a suffragan of the Archdiocese of Siracusa.

When created on 6 May 1950 from territory drawn from the Archdiocese of Siracusa, it remained tied to that archdiocese in the person of Archbishop Ettore Baranzini, who held the title Bishop of Ragusa as well. The Diocese of Ragusa was fully detached from that archdiocese on 1 October 1955.

Ordinaries
Ettore Baranzini (6 May 1950 – 1 October 1955)
Francesco Pennisi (1 October 1955 – 2 February 1974 Retired)
Angelo Rizzo (2 February 1974 – 16 February 2002 Retired)
Paolo Urso (16 February 2002 – 1 October 2015)
Carmelo Cuttitta (1 October 2015  – 28 December 2020)
Giuseppe La Placa (8 May 2021 – present)

Notes

References

External links

David M. Cheney, Catholic Hierarchy page

Ragusa
Ragusa
Ragusa
Diocese
1955 establishments in Italy